Twas Ever Thus is a 1915 American drama silent film directed by Hobart Bosworth, written by Elsie Janis, and starring Elsie Janis, Hobart Bosworth, Owen Moore, Myrtle Stedman, Harry Ham, and Helen Wolcott. It was released on September 23, 1915, by Paramount Pictures.

Plot

Cast
Elsie Janis as Lithesome / Prudence Alden / Marian Gordon
Hobart Bosworth as Hard Muscle / Col. Warren / John Rogers
Owen Moore as Long Biceps / Frank Warren / Jack Rogers
Myrtle Stedman as Joysome / Betty Judkns / chorus girl
Harry Ham as Joe Alden / Sub-editor
Helen Wolcott as Jean Hopkins / Helen Farnum
Joe Ray as A Tough
Ludloe Goodman as George St. John
Charles Wainwright as Jack's Friend
Art Acord as Manservant (uncredited)

References

External links

1915 films
1910s English-language films
Silent American drama films
1915 drama films
Paramount Pictures films
American black-and-white films
American silent feature films
1910s American films